Choi Sung-kuk  (born 8 February 1983) is a former South Korean footballer who played as a second striker. He was banned by FIFA from all football-related activities because of his involvement in match fixing.

Early life
Born in Seoul, Choi began playing football at Donggok Elementary School. While he played for Jeongmyeong High School, his talent earned him a nickname of "Korean Maradona". After graduated from high school, Choi attended Korea University for two years.

Club career
Choi joined K League club Ulsan Hyundai Horang-I on 27 February 2003. 
He adapted quickly to the professional league, scoring seven goals in his debut season. He was nominated for the K League Rookie of the Year award, but lost out to Jung Jo-gook.

In his second season, Choi couldn't concentrate on his club by playing for Olympic team, and scored only one goal during 19 league appearances. He was loaned out to J1 League club Kashiwa Reysol ahead of the 2005 season, but didn't make the reversal of his flow for five months.

Choi became the top goalscorer in the 2006 Korean League Cup, showing his improvement the next year. He also left a memorable game against Al-Shabab in the 2006 AFC Champions League, where he led Ulsan to a 6–0 victory by destroying opponents' defense as well as scoring two goals.
 He moved to Seongnam Ilhwa Chunma after the 2006 season.

Choi went on a trial at Championship side Sheffield United after the end of the 2007 season, but the club decided against signing him. Choi who remained in his country participated in the 2008 Jomo Cup contested between all-star teams of K League and J.League. He led K League to a 3–1 win by having a goal and an assist in the Jomo Cup and was selected as the MVP of the match. In December 2008, Choi enlisted in military football team Gwangju Sangmu to fulfill his military duty.

Choi moved to Suwon Samsung Bluewings prior to the 2011 season, signing a three–year contract. Shortly after, he was announced as the new captain for Suwon. However, Choi was implicated in match-fixing scandal while playing for Gwangju Sangmu. He denied his involvement when media reports raised the allegations about throwing matches, but soon admitted it as the scandal deepened. Consequently, he was tentatively dropped from his team and stripped of his captaincy.

It was officially announced in August 2011 that he would not be able to play in all leagues in South Korea permanently. It was announced that Choi would join Macedonian club Rabotnički on 16 January 2012, but following investigation, FIFA imposed on him a lifelong ban from all sports. His move fell through after the Football Federation of Macedonia rejected his registration.

International career
While at Jeongmyeong High School, Choi was called up to South Korean under-17 team for the 1998 AFC U-16 Championship, and scored two goals in six appearances.

Choi was selected for South Korean under-23 team for the 2002 Asian Games, helping his team finish third. He then won the 2002 AFC Youth Championship with South Korean under-20 team.

In March 2003, Choi was called up to the senior national team for the first time, and made his debut in a 0–0 draw against Colombia. He scored his first senior international goal in a 1–0 victory over Oman in the 2004 AFC Asian Cup qualification. He then played for the under-20 team in the 2003 FIFA World Youth Championship despite suffering an injury. He got only two caps in the tournament, but was selected as one of twelve notable players by FIFA.

Choi also participated in the 2004 Summer Olympics, where South Korea reached the quarter-finals.

Choi was called up to South Korea's squad for the 2007 AFC Asian Cup. He scored a goal in the opening match against Saudi Arabia. South Korea finished third in the tournament after beating Japan in the third place play-off.

Personal life
Choi's mother Kim Jae-young was an artistic gymnast, and Choi's father was also a field hockey player while at school. His father who worked as a bus driver couldn't become an adult player, but taught him to be unassuming. In December 2005, Choi was married Kwak Seon-hye, and became a father a year later.

Choi is a devout Christian.

It was reported on 9 February 2012 that Choi was sentenced on probation for two years and 200 hours of social services for ten months as a result of his actions, relating to match fixing.

Following an end to his professional football career, Choi was hired to work in the hospital as a clerk. He acknowledged that since his football career ended, his family began to struggle economically.

In January 2014, Choi was caught by police for driving under the influence.

In April 2016, Choi was hired as a commentator for sports website Spoplay.

In July 2016, a man was sentenced to six years in prison for threatening both Choi and Kim Dong-hyun.

Seven years later after his professional football career came to an end, he spoke out in an interview about his role to match fixing.

Career statistics

Club

International

Results list South Korea's goal tally first.

Honours
Ulsan Hyundai Horang-i
K League 1: 2005
Korean Super Cup: 2006
A3 Champions Cup: 2006
Korean League Cup runner-up: 2005

Seongnam Ilhwa Chunma
AFC Champions League: 2010

South Korea U20
AFC Youth Championship: 2002

South Korea U23
Asian Games bronze medal: 2002

South Korea
AFC Asian Cup third place: 2007

Individual
Korean FA Cup top goalscorer: 2001
Korean League Cup top goalscorer: 2006
K League All-Star Game Most Valuable Player: 2008

Notes

References

External links
 
 Choi Sung-kuk at KFA 
 
 

1983 births
Living people
Association football wingers
South Korean footballers
South Korean expatriate footballers
South Korea international footballers
Ulsan Hyundai FC players
Kashiwa Reysol players
Seongnam FC players
Gimcheon Sangmu FC players
Suwon Samsung Bluewings players
K League 1 players
J1 League players
Expatriate footballers in Japan
Footballers at the 2004 Summer Olympics
2007 AFC Asian Cup players
Olympic footballers of South Korea
Footballers from Seoul
South Korean expatriate sportspeople in Japan
Korea University alumni
Asian Games medalists in football
Footballers at the 2002 Asian Games
Footballers at the 2006 Asian Games
Asian Games bronze medalists for South Korea
Medalists at the 2002 Asian Games
Sportspeople banned for life
Match fixers